Louise Jones may refer to:

Louise Jones (cyclist), champion cyclist and UCI commisaire
Louise U. Jones, state legislator in Colorado
Louise Jones (athlete) (born 1985), New Zealand sprinter
Louise Simonson, comic book writer known as Louise Jones when she was married to Jeff Jones
Louise Jones, editor of Eerie
Louise Jones, inspiration for Slide Away (Oasis song)

See also
Lou Jones (disambiguation)
Lois Jones (disambiguation)